"Crossfire" is the debut solo single from singer-songwriter and frontman of The Killers, Brandon Flowers. Written by Flowers himself, and produced by Brendan O'Brien, it is the first single from his debut solo album, Flamingo. A video for the single was released on July 8, 2010, and features actress Charlize Theron.

Release and promotion
"Crossfire" first appeared when it was leaked online on June 11, 2010. On June 14, it was premiered in the UK on the Zane Lowe Show on BBC Radio 1, where Flowers also gave an interview.

A 10-inch picture disc vinyl was released in the US on August 3, 2010, featuring an acoustic version of "On the Floor" titled "On the Floor 2.0" on the B-side.
On the week of the August 23 Brandon Flowers was officially the most played artist on the BBC, despite only having one song available for airplay. Crossfire was on both the A playlist for BBC Radio 1 and BBC Radio 2. On September 6 "Crossfire" was No. 1 on the NME chart and remained so through September 27 for several weeks.

Critical reception
The song received mixed reviews from critics. Rolling Stone gave the song two-and-a-half stars, saying it "sounds like a Killers B side — standard-issue Boss-meets-Bono dance rock, with Flowers serving up so much meteorological-metaphor fury, you'll want to call FEMA." Of the track, Billboard said "Flowers simply follows the pop direction that his band has taken of late," and that "Flowers may sound a little too eager to assign an epic quality to his first effort as a solo artist, but 'Crossfire' still hints at a promising direction for Flamingo."  USA Today said of the song that "The Killers' frontman kicks off solo debut Flamingo with a soaring pop/rock anthem in the band's comfort zone." Flowers said that it is his son Ammon's favorite song on the album.

Music video
The music video premiered on July 8, 2010 on Vevo. It was directed by Australian film director Nash Edgerton and stars actress Charlize Theron. The video features various scenes involving Flowers being tied up as a hostage. Theron kills several ninjas before rescuing him each time. The final scene shows Theron putting her arm around Flowers, while driving away with him in a pick-up truck.

In an interview with Fuse, Flowers revealed that Theron was a fan of The Killers, and that she was interested in being a part of the video. She also led him to Edgerton, who was ultimately chosen to direct the video.

Track listings
iTunes download
"Crossfire" – 4:17

Promo CD
"Crossfire" (radio version) – 3:59
"Crossfire" (album version) – 4:17
"Crossfire" (instrumental) – 4:17

10-inch picture disc
"Crossfire" – 4:17
"On the Floor 2.0" – 3:10

Charts

Weekly charts

Year-end charts

Certifications

References

External links
 Official YouTube music video

2010 debut singles
2010 songs
Brandon Flowers songs
Gender role reversal
Island Records singles
Song recordings produced by Brendan O'Brien (record producer)
Songs written by Brandon Flowers